Hyland Fraser (born 1946) was a politician and businessman in Nova Scotia, Canada.

Fraser served in municipal politics for Heatherton from 1984 and was Antigonish County Warden until his resignation in 1998, when he ran for the Liberal nomination for the electoral district of Antigonish.

He served one term in the Nova Scotia House of Assembly, losing the seat to PC candidate Angus MacIsaac by just 12 votes in 1999.

Hyland Fraser died on February 5, 2021, in Edmonton, Alberta, Canada.

References

Nova Scotia Liberal Party MLAs
Living people
People from Antigonish County, Nova Scotia
Nova Scotia municipal councillors
1946 births